O Pitta Katha is a 2020 Indian Telugu-language thriller-drama film starring Viswant,  Sanjay Rao, Nithya Shetty and Adnan Javid Khan in the lead roles. The film marks the film debut of Brahmaji's son Sanjay Rao. This film marks the mainstream film debut of director Chandu Muddu, since his previous film, Ee Cinema Superhit Guarantee (2015), didn't have a high-profile release., and Cinematography by Sunil Kumar Nama.

Plot 
Venky alias Venkata Lakshmi goes missing while on a vacation with her friends. Who is the mysterious man who kidnapped her? What was his motive? These questions form the rest of the plot.

Cast 
Viswant as Krish
Sanjay Rao as Prabhu 
Nithya Shetty as Venkata Lakshmi (Venky)
Bala Raju as Pandu
Brahmaji as Ajay Kumar
 Adnan Javid Khan as Adil
Aqib Nazir Khan as Aqu

Production 
Brahmaji wanted to perform in his son's debut film. Director Sagar Chandra referred him to Chandu Muddu.

Soundtrack  
The songs were composed by Pravin Lakkaraju.

Reception 
The Times of India gave the film a rating of three out of five stars and wrote that "Overall, it’s the interesting and funny twists in the second half that make O Pitta Katha an entertaining watch". The Sakshi gave the film a rating of three stars, out of five, and has further stated that "Despite the confusing screenplay and direction, everyone can watch this film, without any confusion". On the contrary, The Hindu stated that "Sadly here, there is no upgrading in terms of dialogues or entertainment despite having the scope. Songs are pleasing but Sunil Kumar Nama's cinematography highlights the limitations of the artistes".

References

External links 

2020 films
2020 thriller drama films
Indian thriller drama films
Films set in Andhra Pradesh
Films shot in Andhra Pradesh
Films set in Konaseema
Films shot in Rajahmundry